Major League Fishing (MLF) is a professional bass fishing league and television show that airs on Outdoor Channel, World Fishing Network, and Discovery Channel. The league was established in partnership between the Professional Bass Tour Anglers' Association (PBTAA) and Outdoor Channel as an answer to other professional fishing tournaments that the anglers compete in. The show focuses on personalities and struggles of anglers in competition rather than purely on results.

Major League Fishing was the top-rated show on Outdoor Channel and is different from other professional fishing tournaments in that every bass boat has a referee on board to weigh each catch immediately and ensure quick catch and release, and fisherman all have a constant update on how fellow competitors are performing through iPads on their boats. Additionally, anglers do not know where they are going before the day of the competition. The new style of tournament fishing was designed with conservation in mind, which is why fish are weighed and instantly released, anglers are not allowed to land fish or cradle them to their body and fish are never kept in the boat's live well. The shows are fished without revealing results instantly, as the results are shown when the television program airs.

Major League Fishing headquarters are located in Tulsa, Oklahoma.

History 
In 2010, the anglers of the PBTAA met with the Outdoor Channel to outline the first Major League Fishing competition—the 2012 Challenge Cup was filmed at Amistad Reservoir, Texas, in 2011 and aired on the Outdoor Channel in 2012. Professional Anglers Boyd Duckett and Gary Klein represent the anglers and originally came up with the idea of Major League Fishing. Major League Fishing is sponsored by a number of fishing-related companies and external organizations including Bass Pro Shops, General Tire, Lowrance, Sig Sauer and Geico. Many other fishing clubs around the country now use the MLF format for their tournaments, including the Brecknell digital scales used in competition and the SCORETRACKER LIVE! scoring system, as MLF continues to grow.

Anglers 
Professional anglers who currently compete in Major League Fishing are B.A.S.S. or Fishing League Worldwide current or retired pros, including Edwin Evers (fisherman), Kevin VanDam, Mike Iaconelli, Skeet Reese, Casey Ashley, Ott DeFoe and Gabriel Kilgore .

Events 
Major League Fishing has two independent competitions, the Selects and Cups, which are each fished by a different set of anglers. The Cup anglers also compete for a chance to fish the MLF World Championship, which airs on CBS. MLF Cup events feature 3 days of competitions between 10 anglers, with the top 4 advancing from each day of competition into a Sudden Death Round. In the Sudden Death Rounds, the first 3 anglers to hit a designated "cut weight" receive a spot in the Championship Round, which is winner-take-all.

Cup Champions

 2012 Challenge Cup - Brent Ehrler
 2013 Summit Cup - Denny Brauer
 2013 Challenge Cup - Edwin Evers
 2014 Summit Cup - Kevin VanDam   
 2014 Challenge Cup - Kelly Jordon
 2015 Summit Cup - Scott Suggs 
 2015 Challenge Cup - Edwin Evers
 2016 Summit Cup - Kevin VanDam
 2016 Challenge Cup -  Bobby Lane 
 2017 Summit Cup - Mike Iaconelli
 2017 Challenge Cup - Jacob Wheeler 
 2018 Summit Cup - Skeet Reese 
 2018 Challenge Cup - Kevin VanDam 
 2019 Summit Cup - Mike Iaconelli
 2019 Challenge Cup - Jacob Wheeler
 2020 Summit Cup - Takahiro Omori
 2020 Challenge Cup - Jeff Sprague
 2021 Summit Cup - Marty Robinson
 2021 Challenge Cup - Edwin Evers
 
World Champions

 2017 World Championship - Bobby Lane 
 2018 World Championship - Greg Hackney
 2019 World Championship - Jacob Wheeler
 2020 World Championship - Jordan Lee

Bass Pro Tour Champions

2019

 Stage One Kissimmee - Jordan Lee
 Stage Two Conroe - Edwin Evers
 Stage Three Raleigh - Jacob Powroznik
 Stage Four Dayton - Andy Morgan
 Stage Five Cullman - Dean Rojas
 Stage Six Branson - Aaron Martens
 Stage Seven Table Rock Lake - Jacob Wheeler
 Stage Eight Neenah - Cliff Pace
 REDCREST La Crosse - Edwin Evers

References

External links 

Fishing television series